Victory is a town in Essex County, Vermont, United States. The population was 70 at the 2020 census. It is part of the Berlin, NH–VT Micropolitan Statistical Area. Victory was one of the last two towns in Vermont to be linked to the electric grid, in 1963.

Geography
According to the United States Census Bureau, the town has a total area of 43.0 square miles (111.4 km2), of which 43.0 square miles (111.3 km2) is land and 0.04 square mile (0.1 km2) (0.07%) is water.

Demographics

As of the census of 2000, there were 97 people, 45 households, and 27 families residing in the town. The population density was 2.3 people per square mile (0.9/km2). There were 90 housing units at an average density of 2.1 per square mile (0.8/km2). The racial makeup of the town was 97.94% White, 1.03% from other races, and 1.03% from two or more races. Hispanic or Latino of any race were 1.03% of the population.

There were 45 households, out of which 17.8% had children under the age of 18 living with them, 53.3% were married couples living together, 6.7% had a female householder with no husband present, and 40.0% were non-families. 26.7% of all households were made up of individuals, and 11.1% had someone living alone who was 65 years of age or older. The average household size was 2.16 and the average family size was 2.67.

In the town, the population was spread out, with 17.5% under the age of 18, 4.1% from 18 to 24, 24.7% from 25 to 44, 35.1% from 45 to 64, and 18.6% who were 65 years of age or older. The median age was 46 years. For every 100 females, there were 115.6 males. For every 100 females age 18 and over, there were 128.6 males.

The median income for a household in the town was $28,750, and the median income for a family was $38,333. Males had a median income of $28,750 versus $30,000 for females. The per capita income for the town was $18,558. There were 6.7% of families and 13.2% of the population living below the poverty line, including 21.1% of under eighteens and none of those over 64.

References

External links

 Town of Victory

 
Towns in Vermont
Berlin, New Hampshire micropolitan area
Towns in Essex County, Vermont